Eupoca haakei is a moth in the family Crambidae. It was described by Maria Alma Solis and David Adamski in 1998. It is found at low elevations in south-eastern Costa Rica.

The length of the forewings is 7.8-9.5 mm. The ground colour of the forewings is brown mixed with white and pale brown scales. The distal part of the subterminal area is pale brown and the marginal line is brown. The hindwings are pale brown with a brown marginal line.

Etymology
The species is named in honour of Michael Haake.

References

Glaphyriinae
Moths described in 1998